The Uganda clawed frog (Xenopus ruwenzoriensis) is a species of frog in the family Pipidae found in Uganda and possibly the Democratic Republic of the Congo. Its natural habitats are subtropical or tropical moist lowland forest, freshwater marshes, intermittent freshwater marshes, rural gardens, and heavily degraded former forest. It is threatened by habitat loss.

It is also unusual in that it is polyploid, with 12 sets of chromosomes (dodecaploidy).

References

Xenopus
Taxonomy articles created by Polbot
Amphibians described in 1973